Alim McNeill (born May 11, 2000) is an American football defensive tackle for the Detroit Lions of the National Football League (NFL). He played college football at NC State, and was drafted by the Lions in the third round of the 2021 NFL Draft.

Early years
McNeill attended Jesse O. Sanderson High School in Raleigh, North Carolina. He played linebacker and running back in high school. McNeill committed to North Carolina State University to play college football. He also played baseball in high school.

College career
McNeill played at NC State from 2018 to 2020. During his career, he had 77 tackles, 10 sacks, one interception and one touchdown. As a junior, he was named an All-American by The Athletic and Pro Football Focus. After that season, he entered the 2021 NFL Draft.

Professional career

McNeill was drafted 72nd overall by the Detroit Lions in the third round of the 2021 NFL Draft. He signed his four-year rookie contract on May 13, 2021.

References

External links
Detroit Lions bio
NC State Wolfpack bio

2000 births
Living people
Players of American football from Raleigh, North Carolina
American football defensive tackles
NC State Wolfpack football players
Detroit Lions players